The 2016 International Premier Tennis League season (2016 IPTL season, officially the 2016 Coca-Cola International Premier Tennis League) was the third and final season of the professional team tennis league contested by four teams in Asia.

Teams and players
Four teams competed in the 2016 IPTL season.

Although the IPTL had announced that the top stars Roger Federer and Serena Williams would take part in this year, both players withdrew due to financial causes shortly after the league had started.

The Philippine Mavericks did not compete in this season, reportedly due to IPTL's failure to fulfill its obligations to the franchise in the 2015 season.

Schedule
The 2016 IPTL will be played in three cities.

Results table

Standings
Standings are determined by number of points. 3 points for match win, 1 point for loss with at least 20 games wins.
Top two teams qualify for final.

Final

References

External links
 International Premier Tennis League official website

2016 tennis exhibitions
2016
2016 in Asian sport